Strides Pharma Science Limited is an Indian pharmaceutical company, headquartered at Bangalore in southern India. The company manufactures pharmaceutical products, over-the-counter drugs and nutraceuticals. Products include softgel capsules, hard-gel capsules, tablets and dry and wet injectables. Its softgel manufacturing capability consists of an annual capacity of 50,000 machine hours or about three billion softgel capsules.  The company has 15 manufacturing sites in six countries and marketing presence in 50 countries.  In the United States and Canadian markets, the company partners with generic companies to supply retail and hospital generics in injectable products and softgels.  In European markets, it has long-term relationships for the development of projects and supply agreements with the European companies.  In Australia and New Zealand, the company is engaged in manufacturing and supply of soft gels and value-added manufacturing.  The company has development and supply agreements with South African companies. The company's stock trades on the Bombay Stock Exchange and on the National Stock Exchange of India.

Strides Arcolab changed name to Strides Shasun Ltd after an amalgamation of Shasun Pharmaceuticals with Strides Arcolab. In September 2014, the Board of Directors of both the companies had approved a scheme of amalgamation between the two companies.

Arun Kumar is the founder and chairman, and has been on the board as managing director since its inception.

Manufacturing

Indian plants 
In India the company operates eight pharmaceutical plants:

KRSG Anekal - The company has a manufacturing plant at Jigani in the taluka of Anekal in the southern part of the Bangalore metropolitan area. The plant makes soft gelatin capsules, hard gelatin capsules, tablets and ointments.
STAR - Strides Technology & Research - the R&D centre at Bannerghata Road (opp. IIM-B, Bangalore)
On 5 December 2013, the company announced that it had completed the sale of its Agila Specialties Division to Mylan Inc., for a total sum of up to US$1.75 billion.

Non-Indian plants 
Europe - Italy (Beltapharm S.pA)

Global Disease Initiative 
Strides is in the international market for quality generics to fight HIV/ AIDS, TB and malaria. The company works with the Clinton Foundation to make available a range of lower cost anti-retroviral drugs for the treatment of HIV/AIDS as part of the Clinton Foundation's HIV/AIDS initiative.  The company is also on the list of World Health Organization pre-qualified suppliers to supply generic fixed dose combination of anti-HIV drugs. It is an approved supplier to the World Bank, the African Development Bank, PEPFAR President's Emergency Plan For AIDS Relief and UNICEF.

References

http://www.thehindu.com/business/Industry/shasun-pharmaceuticals-to-merge-with-strides-arcolab/article6458529.ece
http://businesstoday.intoday.in/story/best-indian-ceos-2014-arun-kumar-strides-arcolab-pharma/1/212734.html

Pharmaceutical companies of India
Companies listed on the Bombay Stock Exchange
Companies listed on the National Stock Exchange of India
Companies based in Bangalore
Pharmaceutical companies established in 1990